Colusa or Colusi may refer to:

People
Colusa Indian Community, a Wintun tribe

Places
Colusa, California, county seat of Colusa County
Colusa County, California
Colusa County Airport, California
Colusa County Courthouse, California
Colusa, Illinois
Colusa National Wildlife Refuge, California
Colusa Rancheria, California
Colusa Unified School District, California

Other 
 Colusa grass, a common name of Neostapfia colusana, the sole species within the genus Neostapfia